HNoMS Utvær (S303) may refer to one of the following submarines of the Royal Norwegian Navy:

Royal Norwegian Navy ship names